World War II is a series of books published by Time-Life that chronicles the Second World War. Each book focused on a different topic, such as the resistance, spies, the home front but mainly the battles and campaigns of the conflict.

They are each 208 pages in length, heavily illustrated and with pictorial essays on specific topics within the volume. They had no dustwrapper and the cover image was wrap around. There was no title on the front cover; this was printed on the spine.

There are 39 volumes in the series:

Series of history books about World War II
Time Life book series
Book series introduced in 1976